Church of Reconciliation can refer to :

 Church of Reconciliation (Taizé)  

 Church of Reconciliation (Berlin)

 Church of Reconciliation, Dresden

See also
 Church of Our Lady of Reconciliation, Liverpool